The 2010 NCAA Division I men's ice hockey tournament involved 16 schools in single-elimination play to determine the national champion of men's NCAA Division I college ice hockey. The tournament began on March 26, 2010, and ended with the championship game on April 10, in which Boston College defeated Wisconsin 5–0 to win its fourth national championship.

Procedure

The four regionals are officially named after their geographic areas.  The following are the sites for the 2010 regionals:
March 26 and 27
East Regional, Times Union Center – Albany, New York (Hosts: ECAC Hockey League and Rensselaer Polytechnic Institute)
West Regional, Xcel Energy Center – St. Paul, Minnesota (Host: University of Minnesota)

March 27 and 28
Midwest Regional, Allen County War Memorial Coliseum – Fort Wayne, Indiana (Host: University of Notre Dame)
Northeast Regional, DCU Center – Worcester, Massachusetts (Host: College of the Holy Cross)

Each regional winner will advance to the Frozen Four:
April 8 and 10
Ford Field – Detroit, Michigan (Hosts: Central Collegiate Hockey Association and the Detroit Metro Sports Commission)

Qualifying teams
The at-large bids and seeding for each team in the tournament were announced on March 21, 2010. The Central Collegiate Hockey Association (CCHA) and Western Collegiate Hockey Association (WCHA) each had four teams receive a berth in the tournament, Hockey East had three teams receive a berth, College Hockey America (CHA) and ECAC Hockey had two berths each, and Atlantic Hockey had one team receive a berth.

Number in parentheses denotes overall seed in the tournament.

* Alaska has since been stripped of their tournament appearance due to NCAA violations found during a 2014 investigation.

Preliminary rounds
Note: * denotes overtime period(s)
All times are local (EDT/CDT).

Midwest Regional – Fort Wayne, Indiana

Regional semifinals

Regional final

The regional final between Michigan and Miami was not without controversy. In the first overtime, Michigan appeared to score what would have been the game-winning goal when Kevin Lynch scored on a rebound in a scrum in front of the Miami net.  However, after a video review, the goal was disallowed as the play had been whistled dead before the goal was scored to assess a Miami penalty.  NCAA Director of Officials Steve Piotrowski clarified that officials blew the whistle as Lynch touched the puck, with a Miami player touching the puck in the crease and the puck briefly stopped underneath Miami goalie Connor Knapp, both occurring before the goal.  The game continued until Miami sophomore Alden Hirschfeld scored 1:54 into double overtime, securing the 3-2 RedHawk victory.

East Regional – Albany, New York

Regional semifinals

Regional final

Northeast Regional – Worcester, Massachusetts

Regional semifinals

Regional final

West Regional – St. Paul, Minnesota

Regional semifinals

Regional final

Frozen Four – Ford Field, Detroit, Michigan

Semifinals

National Championship

Record by conference

Media

Television
ESPN had US television rights to all games during the tournament. For the sixth consecutive year ESPN aired every game, beginning with the regionals, on ESPN, ESPN2, and ESPNU, and ESPN360.

Broadcast Assignments
Regionals
East Regional: John Buccigross & Barry Melrose – Albany, New York
West Regional: Clay Matvick & Jim Paradise – St. Paul, Minnesota
Midwest Regional: Ben Holden & Sean Ritchlin – Fort Wayne, Indiana
Northeast Regional: Dan Parkhurst & Damian DiGiulian – Worcester, Massachusetts

Frozen Four & Championship
Gary Thorne, Barry Melrose, & Clay Matvick – Detroit, Michigan

Radio
Westwood One used exclusive radio rights to air both the semifinals and the championship, AKA the "Frozen Four.
Sean Grande & Cap Raeder

Tournament awards

East Regional

All-East Regional Team
Goaltender: Jared DeMichiel (RIT)
Defensemen: Chris Haltigin (RIT), Dan Ringwald (RIT)
Forwards: Tyler Brenner (RIT), Cameron Burt (RIT), Bobby Butler (New Hampshire)

Most Outstanding Player
Jared DeMichiel (RIT)

West Regional

All-West Regional Team
Goaltender: Scott Gudmandson (Wisconsin)
Defensemen: Ryan McDonagh (Wisconsin), Brendan Smith (Wisconsin)
Forwards: Blake Geoffrion (Wisconsin), Garrett Roe (St. Cloud State), Tony Mosey (St. Cloud State)

MOP
Blake Geoffrion (Wisconsin)

Frozen Four
G: John Muse (Boston College)
D: Brian Dumoulin (Boston College)
D: Brendan Smith (Wisconsin)
F: Cam Atkinson (Boston College)
F: Ben Smith* (Boston College)
F: Joe Whitney (Boston College)
* Most Outstanding Player(s)

References

Tournament
NCAA Division I men's ice hockey tournament
NCAA Division I Men's Ice Hockey Tournament
NCAA Division I Men's Ice Hockey Tournament
NCAA Division I Men's Ice Hockey Tournament
NCAA Division I Men's Ice Hockey Tournament
NCAA Division I Men's Ice Hockey Tournament
NCAA Division I Men's Ice Hockey Tournament
NCAA Division I Men's Ice Hockey Tournament
NCAA Division I Men's Ice Hockey Tournament
21st century in Saint Paul, Minnesota
History of Fort Wayne, Indiana
Ice hockey competitions in Worcester, Massachusetts
Ice hockey competitions in Detroit
Ice hockey competitions in Indiana
Ice hockey competitions in Saint Paul, Minnesota
Ice hockey competitions in Albany, New York
Sports in Fort Wayne, Indiana